Llanfwrog is a village in Denbighshire, in northern Wales. It hosts a church, 
Llanfwrog
Church of St Mwrog and St Mary. The sturdy medieval tower of St Mwrog's crowns the hill west of Ruthin, marking the point where town gives way to countryside. ‘Double-naved’ in the distinctive Clwydian style, the church is late medieval, but was much altered by Victorian restoration. The church was again restored in 1999. There are fine views from the circular 'Celtic' churchyard – St Mwrog was a little-known Welsh saint, perhaps from Anglesey. On a rise to the south by the road to Efenechtyd stands an ancient thatched and whitewashed house (private).

The church is generally open daily, from mid-morning to late afternoon.

Notes

Villages in Denbighshire